Autoconstructive evolution is a process in which the entities undergoing evolutionary change are themselves responsible for the construction of their own offspring and thus for aspects of the evolutionary process itself.  Because biological evolution is always autoconstructive, this term mainly occurs in evolutionary computation, to distinguish artificial life type systems from conventional genetic algorithms where the GA performs replication artificially. The term was coined by Lee Spector.

Importance of autoconstructive evolution 
Autoconstructive evolution is a good platform for answering theoretical questions about the evolution of evolvability. Preliminary evidence suggests that the way in which offspring are generated changes substantially over the course of evolution. By studying these patterns, we can begin to understand how evolving systems organize themselves to evolve faster. Ultimately, such an understanding could allow us to improve our ability to solve problems with evolutionary computation.

This increased ability for the process of self-replication to evolve is also thought to be important for recreating the open-ended evolutionary process observed on earth

Examples of autoconstructive evolution

Tierra and Avida 
A relatively simple form of autoconstruction occurs in systems such as Tierra and Avida. In these systems, programs replicate themselves by allocating space in memory for their offspring and then looping over all of the instructions in their genome and copying each into the newly allocated space. This is autoconstruction in that the programs are responsible for determining what code ends up in the offspring. Programs most commonly make exact copies of themselves, with changes being introduced exclusively through mutation events. In principle, however, programs can compose a wide range of possible offspring by only copying a subset of their genomes.

PushGP 
PushGP is a genetic programming system which evolves code written in the Push language. Push is a stack-based language designed for easy use in genetic programming, in which every variable type (e.g. strings, integers, etc.) has its own stack. All variables are stored on the stack associated with their type. One of the variable types is executable Push code. As a result, this language design allows for rich autoconstructive evolution by treating all code left on the code stack at the end of program execution as the program's offspring. Using this approach, programs have complete control over the offspring programs that they create.

References

External links
 Autoconstructive evolution with PushGP and Pushpop

Evolutionary biology